Beluga Heights Records is an American record label established by record producer J. R. Rotem. The label is known for discovering and developing Sean Kingston, Iyaz, Mann, and Jason Derulo.

In September 2020, Beluga Heights was acquired by Cinq Music Group.

History
The Beluga Heights label was founded in November 2006 as an equal three-way partnership between Rotem, his manager Zach Katz and his brother Tommy Rotem with Epic Records to help develop new artists signed to the label. In August 2008, Beluga Heights moved to a new joint venture with Warner Bros. Records, where Jason Derulo, Auburn, and Iyaz were signed to the record label. The "Beluga Heights" phrase is commonly found at the start of songs produced by the record label. Beluga Heights is also housed in the Chalice Recording Studios in Los Angeles.

Artists

Sean Kingston (Epic / Beluga Heights)
Jason Derulo (Warner Bros. / Beluga Heights)
Iyaz (Warner Bros./Reprise/Beluga Heights)

Staff

J.R. Rotem – president / record producer / songwriter
Zach Katz – CEO / record manager / legal
Tommy Rotem – Vice president of A&R / artist development
Frisco Lopez – Vice president of A&R

Producers and writers

J. R. Rotem – producer and the founder of Beluga Heights Records
Evan "Kidd" Bogart – songwriter of Beluga Heights Records and founder of his own label "The Writing Camp"
D. A. Doman - co-publishing producer
Jonathan Brown – songwriter
Clemm Rishad – songwriter
William Jordan – songwriter
Kevin Hissink – songwriter
Mike Mac – songwriter
Jordan Baum - songwriter
Travis Margis - songwriter
Samantha Nelson - songwriter
Lolene Everett - Songwriter
Thomas Louis - Songwriter

Discography

References

External links
 Official website

Record labels established in 2006
Warner Music labels
American record labels
Hip hop record labels